Chester Pierce Butler (March 21, 1798 – October 5, 1850) was an American politician who served as a Whig member of the U.S. House of Representatives from Pennsylvania.

Early life and education 
Chester P. Butler was born in Wilkes-Barre, Pennsylvania. He attended Wilkes-Barre Academy and graduated from Princeton College in 1817. He served as trustee of Wilkes-Barre Academy from 1818 to 1838 and served as secretary. He studied law at Litchfield Law School and was admitted to the bar in 1820.

Career 
Butler operated a private legal practice in Wilkes-Barre. He was register and recorder of Luzerne County, Pennsylvania, from 1821 to 1824. He was a member of the Pennsylvania House of Representatives in 1832, 1838, 1839, and again in 1843.

Butler was elected as a Whig to the Thirtieth and Thirty-first Congresses and served until his death in Philadelphia in 1850. He was interred in the Hollenbeck Cemetery in Wilkes-Barre, Pennsylvania.

See also
List of United States Congress members who died in office (1790–1899)

Sources

The Political Graveyard

1798 births
1850 deaths
Politicians from Wilkes-Barre, Pennsylvania
Whig Party members of the United States House of Representatives from Pennsylvania
Members of the Pennsylvania House of Representatives
Litchfield Law School alumni
Princeton University alumni
Burials at the Congressional Cemetery